Darrell Reid (born June 20, 1982) is a former American football linebacker.  He was signed by the Indianapolis Colts as an undrafted free agent in 2005 and was a part of their Super Bowl XLI winning team against the Chicago Bears. He played college football at Minnesota.

Born and raised in Freehold Borough, New Jersey, Reid attended Freehold High School.

College career
Reid played college football for the Minnesota Golden Gophers from 2000-2004, where he was a four-year starter. He arrived at Minnesota as a linebacker, but was switched to defensive tackle in 2001.  During his junior season, he led the team with 5.5 sacks.  Reid switched to defensive end in 2004 and again led Minnesota in sacks with 7.5. This effort gained him a spot on the 2004 All-Big Ten Second-team.

Professional career

Indianapolis Colts
Reid was signed as an undrafted free agent by the Colts, and spent time at the defensive tackle.  He filled in as a fullback in goal line situations, and has played special teams.

Reid won Super Bowl XLI with the Colts in 2007.

Denver Broncos
On February 28, 2009, Reid signed a three-year, $10 million contract with the Denver Broncos.  The deal includes a $1.3 million signing bonus and Reid could earn an additional $2.8 million through sack and playing-time incentives.

Health care fraud case
Reid was charged with one count of conspiracy to commit wire fraud and health care fraud, one count of wire fraud, and one count of health care fraud by the United States Department of Justice on July 24, 2020. He pleaded guilty by December 2020. By February 2022, he had been sentenced to 180 days of house arrest and ordered to perform 240 hours of community service.

References

External links

Official website
Reid's comments on Tim Tebow

1982 births
Living people
Freehold High School alumni
People from Freehold Borough, New Jersey
Players of American football from New Jersey
Sportspeople from Monmouth County, New Jersey
African-American players of American football
American football defensive ends
American football defensive tackles
American football outside linebackers
Minnesota Golden Gophers football players
Indianapolis Colts players
Denver Broncos players
21st-century African-American sportspeople
20th-century African-American people